"City of New Orleans" is a country folk song written by Steve Goodman (and first recorded for Goodman's self-titled 1971 album), describing a train ride from Chicago to New Orleans on the Illinois Central Railroad's City of New Orleans in bittersweet and nostalgic terms.

Goodman got the idea while traveling on the Illinois Central line for a visit to his wife's family.  The song has been recorded by numerous artists in the United States, including two major hit versions: first by Arlo Guthrie in 1972, and later by Willie Nelson in 1984. In Europe, the melody has most often been used for original lyrics rather than translations of Goodman's.

An article in the September 2017 issue of Trains magazine chronicles the writing and recording of the song and includes a biographical sketch of Steve Goodman.

Arlo Guthrie version

While at the Quiet Knight bar in Chicago, Goodman saw Arlo Guthrie, and asked to be allowed to play a song for him.  Guthrie grudgingly agreed, on the condition that if Goodman bought him a beer, Guthrie would listen to him play for as long as it took to drink the beer. Goodman played "City of New Orleans", which Guthrie liked enough that he asked to record it.  The song was a hit for Guthrie on his 1972 album Hobo's Lullaby, reaching #4 on the Billboard Easy Listening chart and #18 on the Hot 100 chart; it would prove to be Guthrie's only top-40 hit and one of only two he would have on the Hot 100 (the other was a severely shortened and rearranged version of his magnum opus "Alice's Restaurant", which hit #97).  In New Zealand, "City of New Orleans" spent two weeks at number one, charting throughout the winter of 1973.

Chart performance

Weekly charts

Year-end charts

Gerard Cox version

In 1973, Dutch singer Gerard Cox released a Dutch-language cover entitled "'t Is weer voorbij die mooie zomer" ("It's Over Again, That Beautiful Summer").  The single reached #1 and #2 on the Dutch and Belgian record charts, respectively. The Dutch lyrics are not about a train, but are a look back on the warm days of summer. Mr Cox had based his version on a French version, Salut les amoureux by Joe Dassin, which he had heard while on holiday in France. Lyrically, it had the same subject as Cox's later Dutch version.

Rudi Carrell version

In 1975, Dutch singer Rudi Carrell released a German-language cover with lyrics by producer Thomas Woitkewitsch.  The lyrics were based on the Dutch version (see above) by Gerard Cox. The single, "Wann wird's mal wieder richtig Sommer?" ("When Will There be a Proper Summer Again?"), stayed on the German record charts for 14 weeks, peaking at #18.  This version has been widely covered, spawning German Top-40 recordings by Creme 21 and Indira Weis.

Willie Nelson version

Steve Goodman won a posthumous Grammy Award for Best Country Song at the 27th Grammy Awards in 1985 for Willie Nelson's version, which was included on Nelson's 1984 album City of New Orleans. It reached #1 on both the Billboard Hot Country Singles chart in the United States and the RPM Country Tracks chart in Canada.

Chart performance

Creme 21 version

Creme 21, a pop band from Frankfurt am Main, recorded a version using Thomas Woitkewitsch's German lyrics.  The cover spent 12 weeks on the German record charts, peaking at #36.

Indira Weis version

"Wann wird’s mal wieder richtig Sommer?" is the first single of Indira Weis, who got famous in the German multicultural R&B group Bro'Sis. Together with the movie producer Andreas Habermeyer she covered the hit from Rudi Carrell for the Oktoberfest 2009 in Munich. The EP  was released September 4, 2009.

The original music video for "Wann wird’s mal wieder richtig Sommer?" was directed and produced in Berlin, August 2009. The video premiered September 4, 2009.

Indira performed the song the first time in front of the Rotes Rathaus in Berlin September 9, 2009.

Track listing

Other cover versions 

 The original English version has been widely covered, including by John Denver (in 1971), The Seldom Scene (in 1972), Johnny Cash (in 1973), Jerry Reed (in 1975), and Judy Collins (in 1975). Denver's version had a different bridge and a few other lines altered, and some other cover artists have copied these changes. More recently, it has been covered by David Hasselhoff (using a combination of Goodman and Denver's lyrics) and Canadian singer Roch Voisine (in both English and French). New Orleans songwriter, pianist and singer Allen Toussaint included "City of New Orleans"  in his concert performances, including the recorded 2010 New Orleans Jazz & Heritage Festival. 
 German lyrics have been written for Goodman's melody at least three times.  The first version was Austrian singer Jonny Hill's 1973 "Ein Zug genannt City of New Orleans" (A Train Named …).  The second, closely following Cox's Dutch version, was used in a 1974 release by Ronny, "Einmal vergeht der schönste Sommer" (Once Passes [Even] the Prettiest Summer). Thomas Woitkewitsch's 1975 lyrics have been used by a number of artists, including Rudi Carrell in 1973, Creme 21 in 1996, and Indira Weis in 2009 (for all of which see above), as well as by Dieter Thomas Kuhn in 1995, Die Lollipops in 2001, and Leonard in 2012.  
 In 1972, American singer Joe Dassin recorded a French version, "Salut les Amoureux" (Hello Lovers), re-using the melody but changing the lyrics completely.  Dassin sings the last line of the chorus a fourth lower than the original on a conventional IV-V-I chord progression. Damien Poyard recorded this version on his 2015 CD "Un parfum de folie" (A scent of madness). Canadian Roch Voisine recorded an English/French version which appears his album Americana.  Quebecoise country singer Guylaine Tanguay recorded this version on her 2022 album "Vos coups de coeur à ma façon."
 Gerard Cox's Dutch version has been parodied a number of times, including by Cox himself in 1973 and by Farce Majeure in 1986 (both times as "'t Is weer voorbij die mooie winter"), and by Wilfred Genee and Johan Derksen in 2012 (as "Nederland is helemaal oranje", a song about the Netherlands national football team recorded specially for UEFA Euro 2012). Cox's version has also seen a number of straight covers, including a 2019 version by Dries Roelvink and a 2020 single by Harten.
 Yehoram Gaon recorded a Hebrew version שלום לך ארץ נהדרת (Shalom Lach Eretz Nehederet, "Hello Wonderful Country") in the seventies. The lyrics by Ilan Goldhirsch describe the beauty of Israel.
 Juha Vainio wrote Finnish lyrics "Hyvää huomenta Suomi" ("Good morning Finland"), which was a domestic hit for the band Karma in 1976 and Matti Esko in 1989. The lyrics describe a semi-trailer truck driver moving cargo over night to his destination. 
 Norwegian folk singer Øystein Sunde recorded "Liten Og Grønn" ("Tiny and Green") for his 1981 album Barkebille Boogie. The lyrics is about the life of a Widerøe Twin Otter airplane.
 The Latvian-American band Čikāgas piecīši|lv (Chicago Five) recorded a Latvian version "Pazudušais dēls" (Lost Son) in 1975.
 Icelandic singer Björgvin Halldórsson recorded a version with his band Brimkló for the 1976 album Rock 'n' roll, öll mín bestu ár. The Icelandic lyrics, "Síðasta sjóferðin" (The Last Journey), were written by Þorsteinn Eggertsson.
 Slovenian Tomaž Domicelj|sl released "Vlak na jug" ("Southbound Train") on his 1979 album 48; the lyrics keep to the original in spirit but leave out details and the chorus opens "Zdravo, Jugoslavija. kako si?" (Hello, Yugoslavia. How are you?).
Me First and the Gimmie Gimmies made a punk rock version of the song in the album Rake It In: The Greatestest Hits, released in 2017.
On September 5, 2005, Jimmy Buffett and the Coral Reefer Band closed their Labor Day weekend performance at Wrigley Field with the song; Buffett referenced the ongoing impact of Hurricane Katrina and dedicated the song to the people of New Orleans and the wider Gulf Coast region. In May 2006, Buffett opened his set with the song at the first New Orleans Jazz & Heritage Festival following Hurricane Katrina.
The 2004 album David Hasselhoff Sings America opens with a cover of City of New Orleans, using Goodman's original lyrics.
Canadian singer Roch Voisine has covered the original version of the song in both English and French.

See also
 List of train songs
 List of 1970s one-hit wonders in the United States
Mentioned in the song
 Kankakee, Illinois
 Club car
 Pullman porter
 Memphis, Tennessee
 "Passengers will please refrain"

References

External links
 
 
 Classic Tracks: Arlo Guthrie's "City of New Orleans"
 "Derailing ‘City of New Orleans’" (Chicago Sun-Times, Nov 19, 2007) - Regarding John Denver's version and Arlo Guthrie's objections to it

American folk songs
Ariola Records singles
Buddah Records singles
CBS Records singles
Columbia Nashville Records singles
Epic Records singles
Reprise Records singles
Song recordings produced by Chips Moman
Song recordings produced by Lenny Waronker
Songs about Chicago
Songs about New Orleans
Songs about trains
Songs written by Steve Goodman
Arlo Guthrie songs
Judy Collins songs
Willie Nelson songs
Joe Dassin songs
Number-one singles in New Zealand
1971 songs
1971 singles
1972 singles
1984 singles